List of bishops and archbishops of the diocese and archdioceses of Utrecht.

Medieval diocese from 695 to 1580

Founders of the Utrecht diocese

Bishops

, rival bishop
, rival bishop

Archbishops

Dutch Mission (1592–1853)

Roman Catholic archdiocese since 1853

Archbishops
Johannes Zwijsen                  (1853–1868)
Andreas Ignatius Schaepman        (1868–1882)
Petrus Matthias Snickers          (1883–1895)
Henricus van de Wetering          (1895–1929)
Johannes Henricus Gerardus Jansen (1930–1936)
Johannes de Jong                  (1936–1955)
Bernardus Johannes Alfrink        (1955–1975)
Johannes Gerardus Maria Willebrands (1975–1983)
Adrianus Johannes Simonis (1983–2007)
Willem Jacobus Eijk (since 2007)

Auxiliary bishops
Goswin Haex van Loenhout, O. Carm. (15 May 1469 – 31 Mar 1475)
Godefridus Yerwerd, O.S.B. (28 Mar 1476 – Jan 1483)
Bonaventura Engelbertz van Oldenzeel, O.F.M. (30 Oct 1538 – 1539)
Nicolas Van Nienlant (6 Jul 1541 –)
Theodorus Gerardus Antonius Hendriksen (21 Jan 1961 – 9 Sep 1969)
Johannes Bernardus Niënhaus (15 Jan 1982 – 1 Sep 1999)
Johannes Antonius de Kok, O.F.M. (15 Jan 1982 – 27 Aug 2005)
Gerard Johannes Nicolaus de Korte (11 Apr 2001 – 18 Jun 2008)
Theodorus Cornelis Maria Hoogenboom 7 Dec 2009 –)
Herman Willebrordus Woorts (7 Dec 2009 –)

Old Catholic archdiocese since 1723

Archbishops
 Cornelius van Steenoven (1723–1725)
 Cornelius Johannes Barchman Wuytiers (1725–1733)
 Theodorus van der Croon (1734–1739)
 Petrus Johannes Meindaerts (1739–1767)
 Walter van Nieuwenhuisen (1768–1797)
 Johannes Jacobus van Rhijn (1797–1808)
 Willibrord van Os (1814–1825)
 Johannes van Santen (1825–1858)
 Henricus Loos (1858–1873)
 Johannes Heijkamp (1875–1892)
 Gerardus Gul (1892–1920)
 Franciscus Kenninck (1920–1937)
 Andreas Rinkel (1937–1970)
 Marinus Kok (1970–1982)
 Antonius Jan Glazemaker (1982–2000)
 Joris Vercammen (2000–2020)
 Bernd Wallet (2020–present)

Notes

Citations

Bibliography

History of Christianity in the Netherlands